Sandrine Hamel (born August 21, 1997) is a Canadian para-snowboarder who competes in the SB-LL2 category.

Life and career 
Hamel was born with scoliosis.

Hamel won the bronze medal in the women's dual banked slalom at the 2021 World Para Snow Sports Championships held in Lillehammer, Norway. She and Lisa DeJong also won the gold medal in the women's team event.

She competed in snowboarding at the 2022 Winter Paralympics in Beijing, China. She competed in the women's snowboard cross SB-LL2 and women's banked slalom SB-LL2 events.

References

External links 
 Sandrine Hamel at World Para Snowboard
 
 

1997 births
Living people
Canadian female snowboarders
Paralympic snowboarders of Canada
Snowboarders at the 2022 Winter Paralympics
Sportspeople from Montreal
21st-century Canadian women